Cara Hope (born 24 November 1993) is a Welsh Rugby Union professional player who plays prop for the Wales women's national rugby union team and for Gloucester Hartpury in the Premier 15s.

Rugby career

Club career 
Hope began playing rugby as a child with the Bangor RFC boys' team, before joining the newly-created Bangor RFC girls' team in 2007. In 2011 she moved to Caernarfon Ladies. She has also played for the Ospreys.

Hope signed with her current club, Gloucester Hartpury, in 2020.

International career 
Cara earned her first cap in the 2018 Women’s Six Nations as a second half replacement in Wales’ third round defeat to Ireland at Donnybrook. She represented Wales at each subsequent Six Nations Championship. She also featured at the 2021 Six Nations Championship.

Hope has won 17 caps in her career to date. She was selected in Wales squad for the 2021 Rugby World Cup in New Zealand.

Personal life 
Born in Bangor, Hope attended Ysgol Gynradd Llandegfan and Ysgol David Hughes before joining Cardiff Metropolitan University, where she graduated with an undergraduate degree in sports and exercise science in 2015. In 2018, she graduated from Swansea University with a research-based master's degree in professional practice in healthcare.

Since 2018, Hope has been a part-time lecturer at Gower College Swansea.

Her mother, Professor Sian Hope OBE, was appointed High Sheriff of Gwynedd in 2017.

References

External links 

 

1993 births
Living people
Welsh rugby union players
Rugby union props
Rugby union players from Bangor, Gwynedd